Geraldine Claudette Darden (born July 22, 1936) is an  American mathematician. She was the fourteenth African American woman to earn a Ph.D. in mathematics.

Early life and education
Darden was born in Nansemond County, Virginia.  Darden earned a bachelor's degrees in mathematics in 1957 from the Hampton Institute, a historically black institute, and took a teaching position at S.H. Clarke Junior High School in Portsmouth, Virginia. In the summer of 1958, Darden saw an opportunity for aspiring mathematicians created by the launch of Russian satellite Sputnik and ensuing US interest in mathematics and science a year earlier, and she applied for and received a National Science Foundation grant to attend the Summer Institute in Mathematics held at North Carolina Central University. Here she met Marjorie Lee Browne, the mathematician who directed the Institute, who would encourage Darden to go on to graduate school.

Darden earned a master's degree in 1960 at the University of Illinois at Urbana–Champaign, and a second master's degree in 1965 and Ph.D. in 1967 from Syracuse University. Her dissertation was completed under the supervision of James Reid, "On the Direct Sums of Cyclic Groups".

Contributions
In addition to teaching, Darden also co-wrote Selected Papers on Pre-calculus, with textbook author Tom Apostol, Gulbank D. Chakerian, and John D. Neff.

References

Further reading 
 Selected Papers on Pre-calculus. Reprinted from the American Mathematical Monthly (volumes 1-81) and from the Mathematics Magazine (volumes 1-49). The Raymond W. Brink Selected Mathematical Papers, Vol. 1. The Mathematical Association of America, Washington, D.C., 1977. pp. xvii+469,

External links 
 Photograph of Geraldine Claudette Darden

1936 births
Living people
20th-century American mathematicians
African-American mathematicians
American women mathematicians
People from Suffolk, Virginia
Hampton University alumni
University of Illinois Urbana-Champaign alumni
Syracuse University alumni
African-American schoolteachers
Schoolteachers from Virginia
American women educators
20th-century women mathematicians
Mathematicians from Virginia
20th-century African-American women
20th-century African-American people
21st-century African-American people
21st-century African-American women